The 1985-86 Los Angeles Clippers season was their 16th season in the NBA, their second in Los Angeles.

Draft picks

Roster
{| class="toccolours" style="font-size: 95%; width: 100%;"
|-
! colspan="2" style="background-color: #CC0033;  color: #FFFFFF; text-align: center;" | Los Angeles Clippers 1985-86 roster
|- style="background-color: #106BB4; color: #FFFFFF;   text-align: center;"
! Players !! Coaches
|-
| valign="top" |
{| class="sortable" style="background:transparent; margin:0px; width:100%;"
! Pos. !! # !! Nat. !! Name !! Ht. !! Wt. !! From
|-

Roster Notes
 Forward Jamaal Wilkes becomes the 2nd Laker to play with the crosstown rival Clippers.
 Forward Rory White would later serve as an assistant coach for the Clippers under coach Mike Dunleavy, Sr. from 2003 to 2008.

Regular season

Season standings

z - clinched division title
y - clinched division title
x - clinched playoff spot

Record vs. opponents

Game log

Player statistics

Awards, records and milestones

All-Star 
Marques Johnson selected as a reserve forward for the Western Conference All-Stars.  This would be his fifth and final All-Star Game appearance.  With Norm Nixon chosen as an All-Star last year, this would make it the third time in franchise history that the team fielded a different player for back-to-back All-Star Games.  The other two times were Bob Kauffman in 1973 then Bob McAdoo in 1974 and Bob McAdoo again in 1977 then Randy Smith in 1978.

Transactions
The Clippers were involved in the following transactions during the 1985–86 season.

Trades

Free agents

Additions

Subtractions

References

Los Angeles Clippers seasons
Los